Megalonycta forsteri is a moth of the family Noctuidae first described by Bernard Laporte in 1979. The species is found in Ethiopia, Kenya and Tanzania.

This species has a wingspan from 36 mm and a length of the forewings of 16 mm.

References

Moths described in 1979
Hadeninae
Insects of Tanzania
Moths of Africa